Oflag VIII-E was a World War II German prisoner-of-war camp for Allied general officers (Offizierlager) located in Jánské Koupele (then Johannisbrunn) in German-occupied Czechoslovakia (now located in the Moravian–Silesian Region, Czech Republic).

Camp history
The camp, a former spa hotel, was opened in July 1940 and housed approximately 70 Allied generals and their aides. Among those officers imprisoned were 30 from Poland, 24 from France, 7 from the Netherlands, 6 from Belgium, 1 from the United Kingdom, and a Colonel from Norway. On April 27, 1942, all the Poles were transferred to other camps, mostly to Oflag VII-A Murnau. Soon after all the other prisoners were also transferred, and the camp was closed on 1 July 1942.

Commandants
 Oberst Hencker (29 October 1940 – 30 June 1941)
 Generalmajor Johann Janusz (1 July 1941 – 19 May 1942)

Notable prisoners
A number of high-ranking officers were held in the camp, including:

Polish

Generał dywizji

 Władysław Bortnowski
 Tadeusz Kutrzeba
 Juliusz Rómmel

Generał brygady

 Roman Abraham
 Franciszek Alter
 Władysław Boncza-Uzdowski
 Leopold Cehak 
 Jan Chmurowicz
 Walerian Czuma
 Franciszek Dindorf-Ankowicz
 Juliusz Drapella
 Janusz Gąsiorowski
 Edmund Knoll-Kownacki
 Wincenty Kowalski
 Józef Kwaciszewski
 Stanislaw Malachowski
 Czesław Młot-Fijałkowski
 Zygmunt Piasecki
 Wacław Piekarski
 Zygmunt Podhorski
 Zdzislaw Przyjalkowski
 Jan Jagmin-Sadowski
 Stanisław Taczak
 Wiktor Thommée
 Juliusz Zulauf

Kontradmirał
 Józef Unrug
British
 Brigadier Nigel FitzRoy Somerset (145th Infantry Brigade)

Dutch

General Henri Gerard Winkelman, Commander-in-Chief Dutch Forces 1940

See also
 List of prisoner-of-war camps in Germany

References

External links

Oflags
World War II sites in the Czech Republic